Rabbi Jacob ben Isaac Ashkenazi (1550–1625), of Janów (near Lublin, Poland), was the author of the Tseno Ureno, sometimes called the "Women's Bible", a Yiddish-language prose work written around the 1590s whose structure parallels the weekly portions of the Pentateuch and Haftorahs used in Shabbat services.

He also wrote a supplement, the Melitz Yosher and Seyfer Ha Magid.

See also

Role of women in Judaism
Tzeniut
Yiddish language
Yiddish literature

References

Further reading

Yiddish-language writers
16th-century Polish rabbis
People from Janów Lubelski County
Jewish translators of the Bible

17th-century Polish rabbis
1550 births
1625 deaths